Yoel Ya'akov Tessler (born 27 June 1973) is an Israeli politician who currently serves as a member of the Knesset for the United Torah Judaism alliance.

Biography
Tessler was born to Efraim and Haya Tessler in Jerusalem; his father was a rabbi and head of the Vizhnitz yeshiva in Har Nof. He grew up in the Sanhedria neighbourhood of Jerusalem, and was educated at the Vizhnitz and Teshbin yeshivas.

After marrying, Tessler moved to Ashdod, where he was elected to the city council in 2013 as a member of Agudat Yisrael, having been a member of the party's religious council. He also worked for the Hamodia newspaper as a project manager, and became assistant to Minister of Health Yaakov Litzman in 2015.

Tessler was placed thirteenth on the United Torah Judaism list for the 2013 Knesset elections, but failed to win a seat as the alliance won seven seats. He held the thirteenth place on the UTJ list for the 2015 elections, but was again unsuccessful as the party won six seats. Prior to the April 2019 Knesset elections, it was decided at the Agudat Yisrael conference that he would replace Eliezer Moses as the main representative of the Vizhnitz community, and he was subsequently placed fifth on the UTJ list. He was elected to the Knesset as the alliance won eight seats. He was placed fifth again for the September 2019 elections, and re-elected as UTJ won eight seats again. Placed eighth on the UTJ list for the March 2021 elections, he lost his seat as the alliance won seven seats. He regained his seat in April when Yaakov Litzman resigned his own seat under the Norwegian Law, but left the Knesset again in June when a new government was formed without United Torah Judaism and Litzman returned to the Knesset.

When Litzman resigned from the Knesset in June 2022 as part of a plea bargain for a fraud and breach of trust case, Tessler returned as his replacement.

References

External links

1973 births
Living people
Agudat Yisrael politicians
Israeli city councillors
Israeli Orthodox Jews
Jewish Israeli politicians
Members of the 21st Knesset (2019)
Members of the 22nd Knesset (2019–2020)
Members of the 23rd Knesset (2020–2021)
Members of the 24th Knesset (2021–2022)
Members of the 25th Knesset (2022–)
People from Ashdod
Politicians from Jerusalem
United Torah Judaism politicians